Allan R. Bomhard (born 1943) is an American linguist.

Born in Brooklyn, New York, he was educated at Fairleigh Dickinson University, Hunter College, and the City University of New York, and served in the U.S. Army from 1964 to 1966. He currently resides in Florence, South Carolina. He has studied the controversial hypotheses about the underlying unity among the proposed Nostratic and Eurasiatic language families.

Books
Toward Proto-Nostratic:  A New Approach to the Comparison of Proto-Indo-European and Proto-Afroasiatic. Amsterdam:  John Benjamins, 1984.
Indo-European and the Nostratic Hypothesis. Charleston:  SIGNUM Desktop Publishing, 1996.
Reconstructing Proto-Nostratic:  Comparative Phonology, Morphology, and Vocabulary.  Leiden and Boston: Brill.  2 vols, 2008
The Nostratic Hypothesis in 2011:  Trends and Issues. Washington, DC:  Institute for the Study of Man, 2011.
An Introductory Grammar of the Pali Language.  Charleston: Charleston Buddhist Fellowship, 2012

with John C. Kerns:
The Nostratic Macrofamily:  A Study in Distant Linguistic Relationship.  Berlin, New York, NY, and Amsterdam:  Mouton de Gruyter, 1994.

See also 
Hermann Möller
Indo-Semitic languages
Nostratic languages

References

1943 births
Living people
Linguists from the United States
Paleolinguists
Linguists of Nostratic languages
Fairleigh Dickinson University alumni
Hunter College alumni
United States Army soldiers
Linguists of Indo-European languages
Linguists of Eskaleut languages
Long-range comparative linguists